James Barber may refer to:

James Barber (author) (1923–2007), Canadian author
James Barber (biochemist) (1940–2020), British professor of biochemistry at Imperial College London
James Barber (politician) (1921–2001), Pennsylvania politician
James Barber (rugby), New Zealand rugby footballer who represented New Zealand in rugby league
James A. Barber (1841–1925), American soldier in the American Civil War
James David Barber (1930–2004), political scientist
Jim Barber (ventriloquist), American ventriloquist
Jim Barber (American football) (1912–1998), American football offensive tackle